was a Japanese translator of Polish literature, and a professor at the University of Tokyo.

Work

Shozo translated, into the Japanese language, classical and contemporary works by Polish writers, including Henryk Sienkiewicz, Jerzy Andrzejewski, Jerzy Broszkiewicz and Stanisław Lem.

Yoshigami was also author of:

 Porando-gono nyumon (Introduction to Polish language), with Kimura Shoichi; and
 Hyojun porando kaiwa (Polish phrasebook), with Henryk Lipszyc.

References

External links
 Interview with Henryk Lipszyc at Gazeta Polska w Japonii 

1928 births
1996 deaths
Polish–Japanese translators
20th-century Japanese translators
Deaths from fire in Japan